Bloodville is a hamlet of Ballston Spa, Saratoga County, New York, United States.

History
It is named after Isaiah Blood, who operated the Ballston Axe & Scythe Works beginning in 1831.

The factories were located on the Kayaderosseras Creek just north of Ballston Spa, and consisted of the lower mill, for the manufacture of axes, and the upper mill, for the manufacture of scythes. Several fires destroyed the two enterprises, but they were rebuilt at a much greater capacity in the 1860s.

From Nathaniel Bartlett Sylvester's "History of Saratoga County, New York," 1878:

Bloodville also contained the lumber-yard, planing mill, and sash factory of Benjamin Barber, who was the inventor and manufacturer of a popular and nationally renowned water wheel.

During its peak in the 1890s, the hamlet contained several stores, churches, a schoolhouse, and a trolley railroad called The Ballston Terminal Railroad. The tool factories were purchased by the American Axe & Tool Company (the hard edge tool trust) in 1892, but ten years later, both enterprises were completely destroyed in two separate fires. Today the hamlet is a popular residential area.

References

External links 
 History of Saratoga County, 1878
 Saratoga County History: Industry, Railroads, and Inventions
 The Village of Ballston Spa

Hamlets in Saratoga County, New York
Hamlets in New York (state)